Mikstat Transmitter (RTCN Mikstat) is a 273 metre tall guyed mast for FM and TV situated at Mikstat, Ostrzeszów County in Poland.

Transmitted programmes

Digital television MPEG-4

FM radio

See also

 List of masts

References

External links
 http://emi.emitel.pl/EMITEL/obiekty.aspx?obiekt=DODR_W1D
 http://radiopolska.pl/wykaz/pokaz_lokalizacja.php?pid=122
 http://www.przelaczenie.eu/mapy/wielkopolskie

Radio masts and towers in Poland
Greater Poland Voivodeship
Ostrzeszów County
1997 establishments in Poland
Towers completed in 1997